The 1994 France rugby union tour of Canada and New Zealand was a series of matches played in June and July 1994 in Canada and New Zealand by France. After an unexpected loss to Canada, France became the first Northern Hemisphere nation to win a test match series in New Zealand.

France also became the fifth team after the 1937 Springboks, 1949 Wallabies, 1971 British Lions and 1986 Wallabies to win a test series in New Zealand.

Matches
Scores and results list France's points tally first.

Highlights
The 22–8 victory on 26 June was the biggest win by France over New Zealand up to then. In the second test, on 3 July, New Zealand led 20–16 with three minutes of the match remaining. It was the first time a side from a northern hemisphere nation had won a test series against the All Blacks.

Touring party

Backs
Sebastien Viars
Jean-Luc Sadourny
Emile Ntamack
Philippe Saint-Andre
Laurent Leflamand
William Techoueyres
Philippe Sella
Philippe Carbonneau
Yann Delaigue
Thierry Lacroix
Christophe Deylaud
Benoit Bellot
Pierre Montlaur
Guy Accoceberry
Alain Macabiau

Forwards
Sylvain Dispagne
Leon Loppy
Xavier Blond
Marc Cecillon
Abdelatif Benazzi
Jean-Francois Tordo
Philippe Benetton
Olivier Brouzet
Olivier Roumat
Olivier Merle
Christian Califano
Laurent Benezech
Laurent Seigne
Louis Armary
Jean-Michel Gonzalez

References

Further reading

France tour
Rugby union tours of Canada
Rugby union tours of New Zealand
France national rugby union team tours
1994
1994 in Canadian rugby union
tour
tour